David G. Dalin (born 28 June 1949) is an American rabbi and historian, and the author, co-author, or editor of twelve books on American Jewish history and politics, and Jewish-Christian relations.

Career

Dalin received a B.A. from the University of California at Berkeley, where he was elected to Phi Beta Kappa, an M.A. and Ph.D. from Brandeis University, and a second M.A. and rabbinic ordination from the Jewish Theological Seminary of America. In 2015, he was awarded an honorary Doctorate of Divinity from the Jewish Theological Seminary.

He is currently a senior research fellow at the Bernard G. and Rhoda G. Center at Brandeis University. He has taught Jewish Studies at several universities, has been a visiting professor at the Jewish Theological Seminary of America and George Washington University, and has been the Taube Research Fellow in American History at Stanford University. During the 2002–2003 academic year, Dalin was a visiting fellow at the James Madison Program in American Ideals and Institutions at Princeton University. Since 2006, he has been a member of Princeton University's James Madison Society.

Dalin's numerous articles and book reviews have appeared in American Jewish History, Commentary, First Things, The Weekly Standard, and the American Jewish Year Book.  He has served as a member of the Editorial and Advisory Board of the journal First Things, of the editorial board of the journal Conservative Judaism, and a member of the Academic Advisory Council of the American Jewish Historical Society.

Dalin's book Religion and State in the American Jewish Experience (co-authored with Professor Jonathan D. Sarna of Brandeis University), published by the University of Notre Dame Press in 1997, was selected by Choice Magazine as an Outstanding Academic Book of 1998.

Dalin's newest book, Jewish Justices of the Supreme Court, from Brandeis to Kagan: Their Lives and Legacies, published by Brandeis University Press in 2017, is the first history of the eight Jewish men and women who have served or who currently serve as justices of the Supreme Court. This book was selected as a finalist for the 2017 National Jewish Book Award.

He has also published major articles about baseball's great Jewish superstars, Hank Greenberg and Sandy Koufax.

Dalin serves as a member of the academic advisory and editorial board of the Jacob Rader Marcus Center of the American Jewish Archives in Cincinnati, Ohio, and as a member of the board of directors of the Palm Beach County (Florida) Region of the American Jewish Committee.

Published works

Books
 From Marxism to Judaism: Selected Essays of Will Herberg (1989) editor
 American Jews and the Separationist Faith: A New Debate on Religion in Public Life (1992) editor
 Making a Life, Building a Community: A History of the Jews of Hartford (1997)
 Religion and State in the American Jewish Experience (1997), with Jonathan D. Sarna
 Secularism, Spirituality, and the Future of American Jewry (1999) editor with Elliott Abrams
 The Presidents of the United States and the Jews (2000) with Alfred J. Kolatch
 The Pius War : Responses to the Critics of Pius XII (2004) with Joseph Bottum
 The Myth of Hitler's Pope: How Pope Pius XII Rescued Jews from the Nazis (2005)
 Icon of Evil: Hitler's Mufti and the Rise of Radical Islam (2008) with John Rothmann
 John Paul II and the Jewish People: A Jewish-Christian Dialogue (2008), editor with Matthew Levering.
 Harold E. Stassen: The Life and Perennial Candidacy of the Progressive Republican (2013)
 Jewish Justices of the Supreme Court: From Brandeis to Kagan (2017)

Articles and book chapters
 "How Ruth Bader Ginsburg Became RBG," in The Jewish Daily Forward, March 30, 2018.
 "Gorsuch’s Confirmation Will Be Brutal, But at Least His Religion Won’t Matter," in The Jewish Daily Forward, February 2, 2017.
 "Jews, Judaism and the American Founding," in Daniel L. Dreisbach and Mark David Hall (edited) Faith and the Founders of the American Republic (New York: Oxford University Press, 2014).
 "Jews and the American Presidency," in Gaston Espinosa (edited) Religion, Race and the American Presidency (Lanham, Maryland: Rowman and Littlefield, 2008).
 "John Paul II and the Jews," in David G. Dalin and Matthew Levering (edited) John Paul II and the Jewish People: A Jewish-Christian Dialogue (Lanham, Maryland: Rowman and Littlefield, 2008).
 "Charges of Catholic Anti-Semitism Have Been Exaggerated," in Mary E. Williams (edited) The Catholic Church: Opposing Viewpoints (Detroit: Thomson and Gale, 2006)
 "Jewish Critics of Strict Separationism," in Alan Mittleman, Jonathan D. Sarna and Robert Licht (edited) Jews and the American Public Square: Debating Religion and Republic (Lanham, Maryland: Rowman and Littlefield Publishers, 2002)
 "Presidents, Presidential Appointments and Jews," in L. Sandy Maisel and Ira N. Forman (edited) Jews in American Politics (Lanham, Maryland: Rowman and Littlefield, 2001).
 "Pius XII and the Jews" (originally published in The Weekly Standard, Feb 26, 2001) 
 "America Seems Ready for a Jewish Vice President," Connecticut Jewish Ledger, June 30, 2000.
 "Tzedakah With Dignity: Jewish Charity and Self-Help in Rabbinic Tradition," Conservative Judaism, Fall 1999.
 "The Jewish Theology of Abraham Joshua Heschel," Weekly Standard, January 4, 1999.
 "How High the Wall? American Jews and the Church-State Debate," in Kenneth L. Grasso and Cecilia Rodriguez Castillo (edited) Liberty Under Law: American Constitutionalism: Yesterday, Today and Tomorrow (Lanham, Maryland: University Press of America, 1997)
 Contributor to Symposium: "What Do American Jews Believe?" Commentary, August 1996.
 "Mayer Sulzberger and American Jewish Public Life," in Jeffrey S. Gurock and Marc Raphael Lee Raphael (edited) An Inventory of Promises: Essays on American Jewish History in Honor of Moses Rischin (Brooklyn, New York: Carlson Publishing Inc., 1995).
 "Will Herberg's Path From Marxism to Judaism," in Robert M. Seltzer and Norman J. Cohen (edited) The Americanization of the Jews (New York: New York University Press, 1995).
 "The Enduring Legacy of Will Herberg," Harvard Divinity School Bulletin, Fall 1994.
 "The American Element in the Thought of Will Herberg," American Jewish History, Spring-Summer 1994.
 "Will Herberg," in Steven T. Katz (edited) Interpreters of Judaism in the Late Twentieth Century (Washington, D.C.: B'nai B'rith Books, 1994).
 "Cyrus Adler," in Jack Fischel and Sanford Pinsker (edited) Jewish-American History and Culture: An Encyclopedia (New York: Garland Publishing, Inc., 1992)
 "Heidegger and Nazism: A Review Essay," Conservative Judaism, Summer 1991.
 Contributor to Symposium: "Judaism in American Public Life," First Things, March 1991.
 "Cyrus Adler and the Rescue of Jewish Refugee Scholars," American Jewish History, March 1989.
 "The Jewish Historiography of Hannah Arendt," Conservative Judaism, Fall 1988.
 "Will Herberg in Retrospect," Commentary, July 1988.
 "Cyrus Adler, Non-Zionism and the Zionist Movement: A Study in Contradictions," Association for Jewish Studies Review, Spring 1985.
 "Israel Abrahams: Leader of Liturgical Reform in England," Journal of Reform Judaism, Winter 1985.
 Jews, Nazis, and Civil Liberties, American Jewish Yearbook, 1980
 "Jewish and Non-Partisan Republicanism in San Francisco, 1911-1963," in Moses Rischin (edited) The Jews of the West: The Metropolitan Years (Waltham, Massachusetts: American Jewish Historical Society, 1979)

References

External links
 
 Author's official website
 The Jewish Ledger, Feb 11, 2009 Excerpts: The Presidents of the United States and the Jews

Living people
University of Hartford faculty
University of California, Berkeley alumni
Brandeis University alumni
Ave Maria University faculty
American Conservative rabbis
Jewish Theological Seminary of America alumni
Jewish Theological Seminary of America semikhah recipients
1949 births